Bodewin Claus Eduard Keitel (25 December 1888 – July 29 1953) was a German general during World War II who served as head of the Army Personnel Office.

Pre-war career 
Bodewin Keitel was born on 25 December 1888 in Helmscherode, the son of a landowner. He was the brother of Wilhelm Keitel, later a field marshal and head of the High Command of the Wehrmacht. Bodewin joined the army in 1909 and served during World War I. After the end of World War I, he was retained in the Reichswehr, eventually reaching the rank of colonel. In 1937, he was appointed as the Chief of Training Department ("T4") and was added in the General Staff of the Army.

On 28 February 1938, he was promoted to Generalmajor (major general) and appointed head of the Army Personnel Office. He held this position until 1 October 1942.

World War II 

On 1 April 1940 Keitel received his promotion to Generalleutnant (lieutenant general) and one year later the General of Infantry (general of infantry). In the period from 1 October 1942 to 28 February 1943, he was granted leave to "restore health". His successor in the Army Personnel Office was Rudolf Schmundt. On 1 March 1943 Keitel was appointed commanding general of the Deputy Commanding General XX Army Corps and commander in the military district XX in Danzig.

The liaison officer in the military district XX at the time was Lieutenant Colonel Hasso von Boehmer, who by his friend Henning von Tresckow for his resistance to Adolf Hitler, recruited the brothers Stauffenberg to carry out the assassination of Hitler. On the day of the assassination attempt on Adolf Hitler (20 July 1944)  Keitel was on an inspection tour in his command area. As first general staff officer, Keitel took Boehmer from the Berlin Bendlerblock and a telegram to Keitel from the conspirators and prompted the first steps. Keitel then heard over the radio that the attack had failed and he returned immediately to Danzig. He confirmed by a telephone call to his brother Wilhelm Keitel that Hitler was alive. Boehmer was taken before the People's Court and executed in 1945.

On 1 December 1944 Bodewin Keitel was  moved into the Führerreserve of the Army High Command (OKH). On 3 May 1945 he became a U.S. prisoner of war, then dismissed on 17 April 1947.

Awards
 German Cross in Silver on 2 October 1942 as Generalleutnant in the OKH/Chief of HPA

References
Citations

Bibliography

Literature 

 Deutsches Geschlechterbuch. Band 102. Görlitz 1938.
 Hans-Joachim Keitel: Geschichte der Familie Keitel. Hannover 1989.
 Dieter Lent: Keitel, Bodewin. In: Horst-Rüdiger Jarck, Günter Scheel (Hrsg.): Braunschweigisches Biographisches Lexikon: 19. und 20. Jahrhundert. Hahnsche Buchhandlung, Hannover 1996, S. 315.

1888 births
1953 deaths
German Army generals of World War II
Generals of Infantry (Wehrmacht)
Recipients of the clasp to the Iron Cross, 1st class
Reichswehr personnel
Heads of the Army Personnel Office (Wehrmacht)
Military personnel from Lower Saxony
Recipients of the German Cross
People from Bad Gandersheim